Cunge (Mandarin: 村戈乡) is a township in Litang County, Garzê Tibetan Autonomous Prefecture, Sichuan, China. In 2010, Cunge Township had a total population of 2,663: 1,364 males and 1,299 females: 787 aged under 14, 1,783 aged between 15 and 65 and 139 aged over 65.

See also 
 List of township-level divisions of Sichuan

References

Township-level divisions of Sichuan
Populated places in the Garzê Tibetan Autonomous Prefecture